N. Vijayan Pillai (2 April 1951 – 8 March 2020) was an Indian politician and member of the 14th Kerala Legislative Assembly. He represented Kerala Legislative Assembly  Chavara constituency in Kerala Legislative Assembly as CMP candidate
. He started his political career as a Panchayat Member in 1979, and continued to do so for 20 years. He was a member of Kollam District Panchayat from 2000 to 2005.

He was born as the son of V. Narayanan Pillai, a veteran RSP leader and Bhavani Amma, on 2 April 1951. Vijayan Pillai was a member of the CPI-M and won the legislative assembly election with a groundbreaking victory never imagined in the history of Chavara constituency as he won against Shibu Baby John who was the sitting MLA. Vijayan Pillai was known for his social service in Chavara society and for his welfare programs. He brought in good amount of reforms in social upliftment of common man in Chavara constituency.His son Sujith Vijayan Pillai is the current member of  Kerala Legislative Assembly from Chavara constituency in Kerala.

He was a prominent leader in the region to bring in employment to youth and always strove to achieve social upbringing of the Chavara constituency with the help of NGOs and ruling LDF government policies. He was keen on reducing unemployment by engaging youth with skill based programs and connecting major businessmen from region as well as NRIs to support the initiative.

Death 
Pillai died of age-related illness on 8 March 2020 at Aster Medcity in Kochi. His funeral was conducted on 9 March 2020 at his native village in Kollam.

References

1951 births
2020 deaths
Kerala MLAs 2016–2021
Politicians from Kollam district
Communist Marxist Party politicians